Gráinne de Búrca,  (born 1966) is an Irish legal scholar, specialising in European Union law. Since 2011, she has been Florence Ellinwood Allen Professor of Law at the New York University School of Law. From 1990 to 2000, she was a lecturer at University of Oxford and a Fellow of Somerville College, Oxford. She was then Professor of Law at the European University Institute, Fordham University School of Law, and Harvard Law School, before joining New York University.

Selected works

References

External links
 

1966 births
Living people
Irish legal scholars
Irish emigrants to the United States
Fellows of Somerville College, Oxford
Academic staff of the European University Institute
Fordham University faculty
Harvard Law School faculty
Corresponding Fellows of the British Academy